"Kelly Watch the Stars" (also written "Kelly, Watch the Stars!") is a song by French electronic music duo Air from their debut studio album, Moon Safari (1998). It was released on 4 May 1998 as the album's second single.

Critical reception
The song was well received by music critics. AllMusic called the song "accessible pop." Drum 'n' Bass: The Rough Guide described the song as "retro-electronics". The song was also included in the book 1001 Albums You Must Hear Before You Die.

Chart performance
The song was commercially successful in the United Kingdom, entering the UK Singles Chart at number 18 on the chart dated 16 May 1998 and spending a total of three weeks in the top 50. The song remains their second highest-peaking single in the UK.

Music video
The music video, directed by Mike Mills, drew attention due to its surreal concept. It depicts a girl named Kelly playing table tennis. She is knocked unconscious, and floats into the night sky. She eventually regains consciousness, and continues to play, eventually winning the table tennis match. Meanwhile, the members of Air seem to be simulating her game while playing Pong on a TV.

Live performances and media usage
The group performed the song on Jimmy Kimmel Live! in 2016, to promote the release of their retrospective collection Twentyears.

A remix of the song was featured on the soundtrack for the 1999 film Splendor. The song was also featured on the 2012 electronica retrospective collection "Electrospective". The song was also featured in an episode of TV shows Daria and Back in Time for Dinner.

Track listings

French CD single
"Kelly Watch the Stars" (edit) – 3:39
"Remember" (Version Cordes) – 2:21

French CD maxi single and Australian CD single
"Kelly Watch the Stars" (edit) – 3:39
"Sexy Boy" (Sex Kino Mix) – 6:33
"Kelly, Watch the Stars!" (album version) – 3:44
"Remember" (D. Whitaker Version) – 2:21

French 7-inch single
A. "Kelly Watch the Stars" (American Girls Remix par Phoenix)
B. "Kelly Watch the Stars" (Remix par Moog Cookbook)

12-inch single
A1. "Kelly Watch the Stars" (edit) – 3:39
A2. "Sexy Boy" (Sex Kino Mix) – 6:33
B1. "Kelly Watch the Stars" (extended version) – 8:12
B2. "Remember" (D. Whitaker Version) – 2:21

UK cassette single
Same tracks on both sides
"Kelly Watch the Stars" (edit) – 3:39
"Sexy Boy (Sex Kino Mix) – 6:33
"Kelly, Watch the Stars!" (album version) – 3:44

Charts

References

External links
 

1998 singles
1998 songs
Air (French band) songs
Virgin Records singles
Songs written by Nicolas Godin
Songs written by Jean-Benoît Dunckel